Kalateh-ye Fathollahi (also Romanized as Kalāteh-ye Fatḩollāhī and Kalāteh-i-Fathullah; also known as Fatḩollāhī, Fatḩ Elāhī, and Kalateh Mālāleh) is a village in Mud Rural District, Mud District, Sarbisheh County, South Khorasan Province, Iran. At the 2006 census, its population was 61, in 14 families.

References 

Populated places in Sarbisheh County